Rose City Antifa (RCA) is an antifascist group founded in 2007 in Portland, Oregon. A leftist group, it is the oldest known active antifa group in the United States. While anti-fascist activism in the United States dates back to the 1980s, Rose City Antifa is the first to adopt the abbreviated moniker antifa. Since 2016, Rose City Antifa has been one of the nine chapters of the  Torch Network coalition.

History 
Rose City Antifa was formed in 2007 to coordinate opposition to a music festival that was planned to be held near Portland by neo-Nazis associated with White Aryan Resistance. 
According to one of its leaders, the group concentrates on "outing" people whom they believe to be neo-Nazis. According to Alexander Reid Ross, the author of the book Against the Fascist Creep, Rose City Antifa grew out of the group Anti-Racist Action (ARA) which first appeared in 1987. Through Rose City Antifa, "the European and American models were sort of synthesized and the current model of Antifa in the US was developed".

Between 2007 and 2013, Rose City Antifa was part of Anti-Racist Action. Since 2016, Rose City Antifa has been part of the Torch Network. In a 2020 interview, RCA activists described the group as having "a strong feminist and queer component", as opposed to a tendency toward toxic masculinity in ARA, and as pursuing tactics going beyond street confrontations with the far right.

Rose City Antifa has campaigned against the white separatist organization Volksfront, the band Death in June, the Ku Klux Klan and the American Renaissance website. The group has organized opposition to Patriot Prayer rallies in Portland. Rose City Antifa clashed with law enforcement officials and supporters of the presidency of Donald Trump following the 2016 United States presidential election. Before a June 2017 rally, the group released a statement saying they would be "unapologetic" over the use of "physical militancy". In August 2020 RCA and Popular Mobilization organized a counter-protest against the Proud Boys in Portland. In September 2020, RCA published a photograph of Patriot Prayer founder Joey Gibson with Chester Doles, a former Imperial Wizard of the Ku Klux Klan. RCA argues that the Portland Police Bureau tolerates crimes by far-right groups while suppressing protests by left-wing groups.

The group has sought to counter the argument that anti-fascist activism infringes on the freedom of speech of the far right. They have argued that the First Amendment to the United States Constitution "protect[s] citizens from state interference, not from criticism by the public ... we do not have a powerful state apparatus at our disposal ... therefore the concepts of 'censorship' and 'free speech rights' are not in any reasonable way applicable." Rose City Antifa also argues that anti-fascism does not target the speech of the far right, but rather targets its political organizing.

See also 
 Antifa (Germany)
 Anti-racism
 Post-World War II anti-fascism
 Iron Front
 Andy Ngo

References

Bibliography

External links 
 Interview with Rose City Antifa, February 24, 2020

2007 establishments in Oregon
Anti-fascist organizations in the United States
Left-wing militant groups in the United States
Political violence in the United States
Organizations based in Portland, Oregon